Edward Sutcliffe (born 1978) is a British painter based in London. He is known for still-life and portraiture, and he has painted prominent figures such as Neil Kinnock and Glenda Jackson.

Education
Sutcliffe was educated at Aberystwyth University where he studied Art History, and Central Saint Martins College of Art and Design where he took a post-graduate diploma in fine art.

Notable Works
Sutcliffe has painted a number of prominent political figures including Glenda Jackson, Sir Paul Stephenson, and the British Labour Party politician Neil Kinnock. His portrait of Neil Kinnock was exhibited at the Royal Society of Portrait Painters Annual Exhibition in 2014, and his portrait of Glenda Jackson was exhibited at the BP Portrait Award in 2011. In 2009, Sutcliffe's work "On Assi Ghat" was selected to by the National Gallery Scotland be the featured on the publicity materials promoting that year's show.

BP Portrait Award
In 2014 Sutcliffe won the 2014 BP Travel Award. He travelled to Los Angeles, California to draw and paint the players of the Compton Cricket Club, producing portraits that show a fusion of two very different cultures and how the game of cricket with its ethos of fair play and honestly has been embraced by this community. The resulting paintings and sketches were displayed at the National Portrait Gallery in London, as part of the 2015 BP Portrait Award.

Exhibitions
His works have been exhibited at a number of exhibitions and galleries, including the National Portrait Gallery, London for the BP Portrait Award (2007, 2009, 2010, 2011, 2012, 2014), The Dubai Arts Centre, and The Lynn Painter-Stainers Prize at The Mall Galleries, London.

Notes and references

1978 births
Living people
20th-century English painters
21st-century English painters